Monastyryovo is a rural locality (a village) in Slednevskoye Rural Settlement, Alexandrovsky District, Vladimir Oblast, Russia. The population was 6 as of 2010. There is 1 street.

Geography 
Monastyryovo is located on the Chyornaya River, 12 km northwest of Alexandrov (the district's administrative centre) by road. Dolmatovo is the nearest rural locality.

References 

Rural localities in Alexandrovsky District, Vladimir Oblast